Ghosts Before Breakfast is a 1928 German dadaist animated short film directed by Hans Richter.  It utilizes stop motion for some of its effects and live action for others. The film does not present a coherent narrative, and includes a number of seemingly arbitrary images.

The original accompanying score composed by Paul Hindemith for a player piano is regarded as lost. New audio tracks have been created by artists such as The Real Tuesday Weld. British composer Ian Gardiner, who has written many scores for cinema and television, created a score for the film in 2006 (premiered by the Liverpool group Ensemble 10/10, directed by Clark Rundell). The UK ensemble Counterpoise (violin, trumpet, saxophone, piano) premiered American composer Jean Hasse's score in 2008, touring the UK - it can be seen on YouTube.

Cast
In alphabetical order
 Werner Graeff
 Walter Gronostay
 Paul Hindemith
 Darius Milhaud
 Madeleine Milhaud
 Jean Oser
 Willi Pferdekamp
 Hans Richter

References

External links
 

1928 films
1928 animated films
1928 short films
1920s animated short films
German animated short films
German black-and-white films
German silent short films
Films of the Weimar Republic
Films directed by Hans Richter
Dada
Short films with live action and animation
Films using stop-motion animation
1920s German films